East Field may refer to:

East Field Stadium
East Field (Saipan)
 East Field Airport now Brown Field Municipal Airport 
Giza East Field
 Strother Army Airfield also called East Field